Dianthus petraeus, the rock pink or fragrant snowflake garden pink, is a species of Dianthus native to Romania, the former Yugoslavia, Albania, and Bulgaria. It is often found growing on calcareous rocky slopes, or in dry highland forest edges. It is occasionally grown in rock gardens.

Subspecies

Only one subspecies is presently considered valid:

Dianthus petraeus subsp. orbelicus (Velen.) Greuter & Burdet

References

petraeus
Plants described in 1807